The Three-Body Problem is a science fiction novel written by the Chinese writer Liu Cixin. The title refers to the three-body problem in orbital mechanics. It is the first novel of the Remembrance of Earth's Past trilogy, but the whole series is often referred to as Three-Body. The trilogy's second and third novels are The Dark Forest and Death's End, respectively.

The first volume of The Three-Body Problem was originally serialized in Science Fiction World in 2006 and published as a standalone book in 2008, becoming one of the most successful Chinese science fiction novels of the last two decades. The novel received the Chinese Science Fiction Yinhe ("Galaxy") Award in 2006 along with many more over the years. By 2015, a Chinese film adaptation of the same name was in production.

The English translation by Ken Liu was published by Tor Books in 2014. Thereafter, it became the first Asian novel ever to win a Hugo Award for Best Novel, and was nominated for the Nebula Award for Best Novel.

The series portrays a fictional past, present and future where, in the first book, Earth encounters an alien civilization in a nearby star system that consists of three solar-type stars orbiting each other in an unstable three-body system.

Background 
The author, Liu Cixin, was born in Beijing in June 1963. He was an engineer before writing science fiction. In 1989 he wrote Supernova Era and China 2185, but neither book were published at that time. Liu's first published short story, Whalesong, was published in Science Fiction World in June 1999. In the same year his novel With Her Eyes won the Galaxy Award. In 2000 he wrote The Wandering Earth and received the Galaxy Award again. The Wandering Earth was adapted into a film in 2019. When the short story Mountain appeared in January 2006, many readers wrote that they hoped he would write a novel. Therefore, he decided to concentrate on novel-length texts rather than on short stories. The other two famous novels besides The Three-Body Problem series are Supernova Era and Ball Lightning.  When he was not otherwise busy, he wrote three to five thousand words a day, and each of his books took about one year to complete.

English translation 
In 2012, Chinese-American science-fiction author Ken Liu and translator Joel Martinsen were commissioned by the China Educational Publications Import and Export Corporation (CEPIEC) to produce an English translation of The Three-Body Problem, with Liu translating the first and last volumes, and Martinsen translating the second volume. In 2013, it was announced that the series would be published by Tor in the United States, and by Head of Zeus in the United Kingdom.

Liu and Martinsen's translation of the novels contains footnotes explaining references to Chinese history that may be unfamiliar to international audiences. There are also some changes in the order of the chapters for the first volume. In the translated version chapters which take place during the Cultural Revolution appear at the beginning of the novel, rather than in middle, as they were serialized in 2006 and also as they appeared in the standalone version of the novel published in 2008. According to the author, these chapters had originally been intended as the opening, but were moved by his publishers to avoid attracting the attention of government censors.

Plot

During the Cultural Revolution, Ye Wenjie, an astrophysics graduate from Tsinghua University, witnesses her father get beaten to death during a struggle session by Red Guards from Tsinghua High School, who were supported by Ye's mother and younger sister. Ye is officially branded a traitor and is forced to join a labor brigade in Inner Mongolia, where she befriends a government journalist who enlists Ye's help in transcribing a letter to the government. The letter details policy suggestions based on the foreign Western book Silent Spring, which Ye read. To save himself, the journalist betrays Ye, who is sentenced to prison after the letter is viewed as seditious by the government. In prison, Ye is recruited by Yang Weining and Lei Zhicheng, two military physicists working under Red Coast, a secret Chinese initiative to use high-powered radio waves to damage spy satellites. 

After working with them for some time, she learns that the stated purpose is a front for Red Coast's true intention: the search for extraterrestrial life. Ye discovers the possibility of amplifying outgoing radio waves by using microwave cavities within the sun and sends an interstellar message. Eight years later, now in a loveless marriage with Yang, Ye receives a message from a concerned alien pacifist from the planet Trisolaris, warning her not to respond or else the inhabitants of Trisolaris will find and invade Earth. The alien describes Trisolaris's environmental conditions and societal history. Disillusioned by the political chaos and having come to despise humankind, Ye responds anyway, inviting them to come to Earth to settle its problems. She murders Yang and Lei to keep the alien message secret.

Some time later, with the end of the Cultural Revolution and Ye's return to Tsinghua as a professor, Ye encounters Mike Evans, a hermit and the son of the CEO of the world's largest oil company. Evans is also a radical environmentalist and antispeciesist. Seeing that Evans is direly angry at humanity as well, Ye confides in him and tells him about the events at Red Coast. Evans uses his inherited financial power to hire men and purchases a giant ship – The Judgement Day – which he converts into a mobile colony and listening post. Upon receiving messages from Trisolaris, validating Ye's story, Evans announces the creation of the militant and semi-secret Earth-Trisolaris Organization (ETO) as a fifth column for Trisolaris and appoints Ye its leader. According to the messages, the Trisolaran invasion force has departed, but will not reach Earth for 450 years. 

The society attracts numerous scientists, minor government officials, and other educated people who are disappointed with world affairs. They assemble a private army and build small nuclear weapons. However, Evans retains control of most resources and starts to alter and withhold alien messages from Ye and others. Furthermore, the society splits into factions, with the Adventists (led by Evans) seeking complete destruction of humanity by the Trisolarans, and the Redemptionists (led by Shen Yufei) seeking to help the Trisolarans to find a computational solution to the three-body problem, which plagues their planet. A third, smaller faction, the Survivors, intend to help the Trisolarans in exchange for their own descendants' lives while the rest of humanity dies.

In the present day, Wang Miao, a nanotechnology professor, is asked to work with Shi Qiang, a cunning detective, to investigate the mysterious suicides of several scientists, including Ye Wenjie's daughter Yang Dong. The two of them notice that the world's governments are communicating closely with each other and have put aside their traditional rivalries to prepare for war. Over the next few days, Wang experiences strange hallucinations and meets with Ye. Wang sees people playing a sophisticated virtual reality video game called Three Body (which was created by the ETO as a recruitment tool) and begins to play himself. The game portrays a planet whose climate randomly flips between Stable and Chaotic Eras. During Chaotic Eras, the weather oscillates unpredictably between extreme cold and extreme heat, sometimes within minutes. 

The inhabitants (who are represented as having human bodies) seek ways to predict Chaotic Eras so they can better survive. Unlike humans, they have evolved the special ability to 'dehydrate', turning themselves into a roll of canvas. They do this in order to lie dormant when the Chaotic Eras occur, requiring another person to rehydrate them. Characters resembling Aristotle, Mozi, Newton, and others try and fail to model the climate as multiple civilizations grow and are wiped out by large-scale disasters. Wang wins acclaim by figuring out how the climate works: (1) the planet Trisolaris has three suns; (2) the suns have different kinds of compositions, and when they are far away from the planet's surface only the core of the sun can penetrate to the surface, appearing in the sky as a flying star; (3) Stable Eras occur when two suns are far away and Trisolaris orbits the third; (4) Chaotic Eras occur when Trisolaris is pulled by more than one sun; (5) firestorms happen when two or three suns are close to the planet's surface; (6) three flying stars causes intense cold because it means all three suns are far away; and (7) eventually the three suns will align and Trisolaris will plunge into the nearest one and be consumed. The game shows the Trisolarans building and launching colony ships to invade Earth, believing that the stable orbit will allow unprecedented prosperity and let them escape the destruction of their planet.

Wang is inducted into the ETO, and informs Shi of one of their meetings. This leads to a battle between the PLA and the society's soldiers, as well as Ye's arrest. The PLA works with the Americans, led by Colonel Stanton, to ambush Judgement Day as it passes through the Panama Canal. To prevent the crew from destroying their communications with the Trisolarans, the team follows Shi's suggestion to use Wang's nano-material filament in a fence to quickly cut the ship apart and kill everyone aboard. However, documents and computers cut by the filament could be reassembled after. Some revelations emerge from the Trisolaran communications: (1) The aliens have extremely advanced picotechnology that allows them to create 11-dimensional supercomputers called sophons which, when viewed in three dimensions, occupy the volume of a proton. (2) Two of these sophons have been laboriously manufactured and sent to Earth, having the power to cause hallucinations, spy on any corner of the Earth, transmit the information gathered to Trisolaris using quantum entanglement, and disrupt all of Earth's particle accelerators. The Trisolarans fear humanity will develop technology advanced enough to fight off the invasion, and decide that disrupting the accelerators to give random results will paralyze Earth's technological advancement until the Trisolarans arrive. 

Once several sophons have arrived, they plan to fabricate visual miracles and other hallucinations on a massive scale to make humanity distrust its own scientists. The Trisolarans detect humanity's revelation via sophons and beam to the eyes of the PLA one final message, "You're bugs!", then cease all communications. Now in custody, Ye is allowed to visit the old Red Coast base, and reflects upon her past choices, noting that humanity from now on will never be the same. Shi Qiang finds Wang Miao and his colleagues in a depressed drinking binge, and sobers them up by driving them to his hometown village in Northeastern China. Shi reflects on how despite all the advances humanity has made with pesticides, the simple-minded locust still manages to survive and thrive. With renewed hope, Wang and Shi return to Beijing to help plan the war against the Trisolarans.

Characters 
In the following, Chinese names are written with the family name first and given name second.

Ye family 

Ye Zhetai (叶哲泰)
Physicist and professor at Tsinghua University. He is killed at a struggle session during the Cultural Revolution.
Shao Lin (绍琳)
Physicist and Ye Zhetai's wife. She is also one of his accusers at the struggle session that ended his life.
Ye Wenjie (叶文洁)
Astrophysicist and daughter of Ye Zhetai. She is the first person to establish contact with the Trisolarans while working at Red Coast Base. She marries Yang Weining and gives birth to a daughter, Yang Dong. She later becomes the spiritual leader of the ETO and directly influences several key events in the series.
Ye Wenxue (叶文雪)
Ye Wenjie's younger sister, a Tsinghua High School student and a zealous Red Guard. She is killed during factional violence at some point after the collapse of their family.

Red Coast Base 

Lei Zhicheng (雷志成)
Political commissar at Red Coast Base. He recruited Ye Wenjie and oversaw her work. She later kills him to keep the secret of the interstellar transmissions.
Yang Weining (杨卫宁)
Chief engineer at Red Coast Base, once a student of Ye Zhetai, later Ye Wenjie's husband and murdered by her as well.

The present 

Wang Miao (汪淼)
Nanomaterials researcher and academician from the Chinese Academy of Sciences. He is tasked with investigating the ETO as well as the recent spate of suicides among well-known scientists. Wang Miao becomes immersed in the virtual reality game "Three Body", through which he learns about Trisolaris.
Yang Dong (杨冬)
String theorist and daughter of Ye Wenjie and Yang Weining. She commits suicide shortly before the present day events.
Ding Yi (丁仪)
Theoretical physicist and Yang Dong's partner. He was previously featured in another of Liu Cixin's works, Ball Lightning.
Shi Qiang (史强)
Police detective and counter-terrorism specialist, nicknamed "Da Shi" (大史), ("Big Shi"). He has a crude demeanor but is highly dependable and often demonstrates keen insight.
Chang Weisi (常伟思)
Major-general of the People’s Liberation Army.
Shen Yufei (申玉菲)
Chinese-Japanese physicist and member of the Frontiers of Science.
Wei Cheng (魏成)
Math prodigy, recluse, and Shen Yufei's husband. He develops a possible solution to the three-body problem.
Pan Han (潘寒)
Biologist, friend/acquaintance of Shen Yufei and Wei Cheng, and member of the Frontiers of Science.
Sha Ruishan (沙瑞山)
Astronomer, one of Ye Wenjie's students.
Mike Evans (麦克·伊文斯)
Radical environmentalist who supports "pan-species communism", also son of an oil magnate. After meeting Ye Wenjie, he becomes the main source of funding for the ETO.
Colonel Stanton (斯坦顿)
Officer of U.S. Marine Corps, commander of Operation Guzheng.

Inspiration 
Liu Cixin was born in 1963. When he was 3 years old, his family moved from the Beijing Coal Design Institute to Yangquan in Shanxi Province due to his father's job change. He also spent part of his childhood in the countryside of his ancestral hometown Luoshan County, Henan Province. April 25, 1970, was a pivotal moment for Liu. Looking back on his science-fiction journey, he recalls the day when China's first satellite, Dong Fang Hong 1, was launched, and as he stood by the pond looking up at the starry sky, he felt an indefinable sense of longing.

A few years later, one summer evening, Liu Cixin found an entire box of books under his bed in his home in Yangquan. There was an anthology of Tolstoy, Moby-Dick, Jules Verne's Journey to the Center of the Earth, and Rachel Carson's Silent Spring. The first book he read was Journey to the Center of the Earth, about which his father told him: "It's called science fiction, it's a creative writing based on science". This was his first encounter with science fiction: "My persistence stems from the words of my father". At that time, these books could only be read privately by individuals; "I felt like being alone on an island, is a very lonely state".

The reverence, or even fear, of the Universe, is one of the main prompting force of Liu's writing. According to him, as humans, we will stand in awe of the scale and depth of the universe. His novels also focus on the curiosity of the unknown. Liu Cixin says he cannot help thinking about the future world and lifestyle of human beings, and he tries to invoke readers' curiosity with his books. He also believes that the humans should be treated as an entirety.

Reception
In December 2019, The New York Times cited The Three-Body Problem as having helped to popularize Chinese science fiction internationally, crediting the quality of Ken Liu's English translation, as well as endorsements of the book by George R. R. Martin, Facebook founder Mark Zuckerberg, and former U.S. president Barack Obama. George R. R. Martin wrote a blog about the novel, personally expressing its worthiness of the Hugo Award. Obama said the book had "immense" scope, and that it was "fun to read, partly because my day-to-day problems with Congress seem fairly petty".

Kirkus Reviews wrote that "in concept and development, it resembles top-notch Arthur C. Clarke or Larry Niven but with a perspective—plots, mysteries, conspiracies, murders, revelations and all—embedded in a culture and politic dramatically unfamiliar to most readers in the West, conveniently illuminated with footnotes courtesy of translator Liu." Joshua Rothman of The New Yorker also called Liu Cixin "China's Arthur C. Clarke", and similarly observed that in "American science fiction ... humanity's imagined future often looks a lot like America’s past. For an American reader, one of the pleasures of reading Liu is that his stories draw on entirely different resources", citing his use of themes relating to Chinese history and politics.

Matthew A. Morrison writes that the novel can "evoke a response all but unique to the genre: an awe at nature and the universe SF readers call a 'sense of wonder'." Due to the novels' groundbreaking success and reception, Netflix announced in 2020 that Game of Thrones writers David Benioff and D. B. Weiss are adapting the series into a sci-fi TV drama.

Also, some Chinese scholars found that the Western readers appreciate the zero-moral universe depicted in the trilogy of The Three Body Problems, which is considered to promote rationalism. Liu Cixin tries to answer the existential dilemma of "where should mankind go from here" through various efforts.

Awards and nominations

Trilogy

The subsequent books in the Remembrance of Earth's Past trilogy are:

黑暗森林 (The Dark Forest), 2008; English translation by Joel Martinsen published by Tor Books in 2015
死神永生 (Death's End), 2010; English translation by Ken Liu published by Tor Books in 2016

Translations

 Bulgarian: Трите тела , 2020
 Czech: Problém tří těles, 2017
 Dutch: Het drielichamenprobleem, 2020
English: The Three Body Problem, 2014
 Finnish: Kolmen kappaleen probleema, 2018
 French: Le Problème à trois corps, 2016
 German: Die drei Sonnen, 2016
 Greek: Το πρόβλημα των τριών σωμάτων, 2016
 Hungarian: A Háromtest-probléma, 2016
 Indonesian: "Trisurya", 2019
 Italian: Il problema dei tre corpi, 2017
 Lithuanian: Trijų kūnų problema, 2020
 Japanese: 三体, 2019
 Mongolian: Гурван биет, 2019 
 Norwegian: Trelegemeproblemet, 2019
 Polish: Problem trzech ciał, 2017
 Portuguese: O Problema dos Três Corpos, 2016
 Romanian: Problema celor trei corpuri, 2017
 Russian: Задача трех тел, 2016
 Serbian: Problem tri tela 2019
 South Korea: 삼체, 2013
 Spanish: El problema de los tres cuerpos, 2016
 Thai: ดาวซานถี่ อุบัติการสงครามล้างโลก, 2016
 Turkish: Üç Cisim Problemi, 2015
 Ukrainian: Проблема трьох тіл, 2017
 Vietnamese: Tam Thể, 2016

Adaptations

Music
There is a significant amount of fan-made music for the trilogy.
 PROJECT Three-Body OST is a 2011 fan-made soundtrack album by Chinese electronic musician Wang Lifu. Lifu stated that the album was mostly composed of simple demos he wrote as he was reading the novel.
 Live from Afar Vol. 1: Three Body in Sound is a 2017 album also by Wang Lifu. It was aired first in a live session on the question-and-answer website Zhihu as part of a live session series called Interpretation of Books: The Beauty of Expertise and Insight.

Film
 The Three-Body Problem is a postponed Chinese science fiction 3D film directed by Fanfan Zhang and starring Feng Shaofeng and Zhang Jingchu. The film shooting was done, but it was never completed or released.

Comics
 A serialized digital comic adaptation has been published by Tencent Comics since 2019.

Audio book
 The chapters of Three Body Problem were featured in serial podcast Stories From Among the Stars produced by Tor Books and Macmillan in July 2021.

Animation
 The Three-Body Problem in Minecraft is an fan-made (later officially-sanctioned) animated adaptation of the series, directed by Shenyou (Zhenyi Li). It was initially animated entirely as an amateur Minecraft machinima, with a low budget and production quality for its first season in 2014. According to Xu Yao, the CEO of The Three-Body Universe, Shenyou chose this medium out of the minimal budget, as Minecraft allows its players to design environments with ease and does not require animation. The machinima format, after the first season's first few episodes, was later converted into Minecraft-styled computer animation due to the show's success.
 The Three-Body Problem is a 2022 computer animation series produced by Bilibili, a Chinese video sharing website and anime streaming service. In 2019, Bilibili announced their plan to produce a computer-animated adaptation in partnership with YHTK Entertainment and intellectual property management company The Three-Body Universe. The first teaser was released in November 2019. The show was originally scheduled for a 2021 release. Later, Bilibili announced the series would premiere on 3 December 2022.

Television series
 A Chinese TV adaptation produced by Tencent Video premiered on 16 January 2023.
 An American TV series based on the book has been ordered by Netflix, with David Benioff, D.B. Weiss, and Alexander Woo set to write and executive produce. The Netflix adaptation began production on 1 November 2021, with a scheduled finish date in August 2022. The release date is in 2023.
 A 3-part documentary series entitled Rendezvous with the Future which explores the science behind Liu Cixin’s science fiction was produced by BBC Studios and released by Bilibili in China in November 2022. The first episode covers many ideas featured in The Three-Body Problem such as messaging extraterrestrial civilisations and the possibility of a gravitational wave transmitter. An international version of the series has not yet been released.

References

External links

 

2008 Chinese novels
2008 science fiction novels
Science fiction novel trilogies
Novels by Liu Cixin
Alien invasions in novels
Hugo Award for Best Novel-winning works
Alpha Centauri in fiction
Novels about the Cultural Revolution
Chinese novels adapted into films
Chinese novels adapted into television series
Works originally published in Chinese magazines
Search for extraterrestrial intelligence in literature
Tor Books books
Head of Zeus books